Suburban Noize Records, also known as "Subnoize", is an independent record label based in Burbank, California that specializes in punk rock and hip hop music. The label was founded in 1997 by the Kottonmouth Kings' vocalist Daddy X and Kevin Zinger.

History 
A majority of the label's merchandise and album sales are via the Internet and merchandising booths at live performances. The label relies heavily on word of mouth and underground promotion techniques.

A feud in 2013 between the label's founders, Daddy X and Kevin Zinger, put the label in limbo for a few years. On April 9, 2019, it was announced that Suburban Noize was reforming with Madchild, Kottonmouth Kings, Hed PE, Swollen Members, Big B, Chucky Chuck of DGAF, Saint Dog, UnderRated of Potluck and Moonshine Bandits.

On November 1, 2019, it was announced that Whitney Peyton had signed to Suburban Noize.

On May 1, 2020, it was announced that San Diego rapper Obnoxious had signed to the label.

On April 6, 2021, it was announced that Dropout Kings had signed to Subnoize.

Artists

Current artists

Former artists

References

External links 
 Official site

American record labels
Record labels established in 1995
Hip hop record labels
Punk record labels
American independent record labels